Jack Dusty Rhodes (born 1946) is a retired American baseball coach and the former head coach of the University of North Florida Ospreys college baseball team. He was the first coach in UNF baseball history, having founded the program in the 1980s and serving as head coach from 1988–2010. UNF's baseball field, officially Dusty Rhodes Field at Harmon Stadium, is named in his honor.

Life
Dusty Rhodes started his coaching career in the minor leagues, working in the New York Yankees and Milwaukee Brewers organizations. He then shifted to college baseball, coaching at Palm Beach Junior College. He was hired by UNF in 1986 to start up the school's first baseball program.

As the coach at UNF, he saw the program through its days in the National Association of Intercollegiate Athletics (NAIA), NCAA Division II, and finally NCAA Division I. While in the NAIA he led UNF to three Number 1 rankings in NAIA and the Number 1 ranking in NCAA Division II in 1999, 2000, 2001 and 2002. He coached the Ospreys to two NAIA World Series, and three Division II World Series, with a second place finish in the team's final year of Division II competition. In 2005, UNF's first season of Division I play, he led the Ospreys to a 34-21 record. In 2008, the Ospreys defeated four in-state opponents (the Florida Gators, Florida State Seminoles, Miami Hurricanes, and South Florida Bulls).

In 2004, Rhodes was the coach of the Greek national baseball team for the 2004 Athens Olympics. The team finished in 7th, with one win over Italy. He has also worked with the USA national team as an assistant. He also operated a baseball camp each year that takes place at Harmon Stadium.

Rhodes announced his retirement after the 2010 season. That summer he married his longtime girlfriend, a UNF employee. He was succeeded as head baseball coach by Smoke Laval. In 2010 UNF named its baseball field Dusty Rhodes Field at Harmon Stadium after Rhodes.

After retiring from college coaching, Rhodes served as  the hitting coach for the Wisconsin Timber Rattlers, Midwest League single-A affiliate of the Milwaukee Brewers from 2011 to 2013.

References

1946 births
Baseball coaches from Florida
Florida Atlantic University alumni 
Florida Gators baseball coaches
Florida Southern College alumni
Florida Southern Moccasins baseball coaches
Living people
Minor league baseball coaches
North Florida Ospreys baseball coaches
Palm Beach State College alumni
Palm Beach State Panthers baseball coaches
Sportspeople from Jacksonville, Florida